Falling Leaves may refer to:
 Falling Leaves (play), a 1924 play by the British writer Sutton Vane
 Falling Leaves (1912 film), American short film
 Falling Leaves (1966 film), Russian film
 Falling Leaves (memoir), 1997 memoir of Chinese-American physician Adeline Yen Mah
 Falling Leaves (radar network)
 The Falling Leaves, a poem by Margaret Postgate-Cole